Founded in 1998, Alfred E. Mann Institute for Biomedical Engineering at the University of Southern California (AMI-USC) is a 501c(3) non-profit organization dedicated to biomedical engineering technology development. The institute is located on the University Park Campus of USC in Los Angeles, California and focuses on helping to bridge the gap between discovery research and product commercialization. As of 2017, the institute financial endowment is $180 million, with over $150 million donated by medical device entrepreneur and philanthropist Alfred E. Mann.

References

External links
 Alfred E. Mann Institute

Institutes of the University of Southern California
Medical research institutes in California
Research institutes established in 1998
1998 establishments in California
Science and technology in Greater Los Angeles